Mary Jane Croft (February 15, 1916 – August 24, 1999) was an American actress best known for her roles as Betty Ramsey on I Love Lucy, Miss Daisy Enright on the radio and television versions of Our Miss Brooks, Mary Jane Lewis on The Lucy Show and Here's Lucy, and Clara Randolph on The Adventures of Ozzie and Harriet.

Early career
Described as "a stage-struck 17-year-old just out of high school", she started her career on the stage of the Muncie Civic Theatre. She quickly joined the Guild Theatre company, a new theatrical stock company in Cincinnati. From that, she went to radio station WLW. Croft said of her work at WLW, "from 1935 to 1939, I played parts with every kind of voice and accent: children, babies, old women, society belles, main street floozies – everything."

Radio
Croft's initial appearance on radio was in Sherlock Holmes. She worked extensively as an actress in radio, appearing on such programs as Life with Luigi, Blondie, The Adventures of Sam Spade, Suspense, The Beulah Show, The Bill Goodwin Show, Broadway Is My Beat, On Stage, Crime Classics, Four-Star Playhouse, The Harold Peary Show, Joan Davis Time, The Mel Blanc Show, One Man's Family, Our Miss Brooks, and Sears Radio Theater. She also appeared in frequent guest-star roles on Lucille Ball's My Favorite Husband, the beginning of their later professional and personal relationship.

Croft and Hal March co-starred in Too Many Cooks, a summer replacement program on CBS in 1950. The comedy centered on Douglas and Carrie Cook and their 10 children.

Television
In addition to her work with Lucille Ball, she was a frequent guest star on other television programs, including Howard Duff's adventure/drama series Dante in the 1960 episode "The Misfortune Cookie".

She was a regular on at least two other series, as Clara Randolph the ebullient neighbor with the shrill voice married to Joe Randolph played by Hollywood veteran Lyle Talbot on The Adventures of Ozzie and Harriet, and on Our Miss Brooks on CBS, in which she reprised her radio role as Miss Daisy Enright, the title character's rival. She provided the voice for Cleo the Basset Hound in Jackie Cooper's NBC series The People’s Choice (1955–58).

Late in the weekly run of the original I Love Lucy series, the major characters moved to Connecticut. There, Lucy Ricardo befriended a new neighbor, Betty Ramsey (portrayed by Croft), who was very socially conscious and tended to get Lucy involved in adventures different from those that involved Ethel Mertz (Vivian Vance). Croft had previously guest-starred as Lucy's wealthy schoolmate Cynthia Harcourt in "Lucy is Envious", then as Evelyn Bigsby, the airline passenger seated next to Lucy in "Return Home from Europe", the episode in which Lucy disguises a hunk of cheese as a baby.

When Vance left The Lucy Show after the 1964–1965 season, Croft became Lucy's new sidekick, Mary Jane Lewis. Croft had previously had a recurring role as Audrey Simmons during the show's early seasons set in Danfield, New York. Mary Jane Lewis was Croft's legal name at the time, as she was then married to actor-producer Elliott Lewis (who had originally produced The Lucy Show during its first two seasons), but continued to use her maiden name professionally. Her only son, by a prior marriage, was killed in the Vietnam War during the period that she was co-starring with Ball.

The Lewis character was maintained when The Lucy Show was transformed into Ball's third sitcom, Here's Lucy. The character remained until Ball decided to end Here's Lucy in 1974.

Croft made an unsold pilot, The Two of Us, that centered on a children's books illustrator. The pilot was produced by Desilu.

Later years and death
Croft continued to act in television for several years after the end of Here's Lucy, even reuniting with Ball in 1977 in the special Lucy Calls the President. She also returned to radio for several episodes of Sears Radio Theater in 1979.

She died of natural causes in Century City, California.

Personal life
Croft married actor Jack Zoller, but they divorced after a short time. She married Elliott Lewis in 1959 and remained wed until his death in 1990. Croft had a son, Eric, by her first marriage, who was killed in action during the Vietnam War.

Filmography

References

External links

Mary Jane Croft Honored 

1916 births
1999 deaths
20th-century American actresses
American stage actresses
American film actresses
American television actresses
American radio actresses
Actresses from Indiana
People from Muncie, Indiana